Village by the River is a 1958 Dutch film directed by Fons Rademakers. The film was nominated for the Best Foreign Language Film at the 32nd Academy Awards.

Cast
Max Croiset	... 	Dr. Van Taeke
Mary Dresselhuys	... 	Mrs. Van Taeke
Bernhard Droog	... 	Cis den Dove
Jan Retèl	... 	Thijs van Erpen
Jan Teulings	... 	Burgemeester
Jan Lemaire Sr.	... 	Willem
Hans Kaart	... 	Sjef
Herman Bouber	... 	Nardje
Tamara Garcia	... 	Zigeunerin
Huib Orizand	... 	Pie
Frits Butzelaar		
Louis van Gasteren Sr.	... 	Oom Jan
Lou Geels		...     Veldwachter
Frans 't Hoen	... 	Dirk Jan

Awards
Nominated
 Academy Award: Best Foreign Language Film
 Berlin Film Festival: Golden Bear

See also
 List of submissions to the 32nd Academy Awards for Best Foreign Language Film
 List of Dutch submissions for the Academy Award for Best Foreign Language Film

References

External links 
 

1958 films
1958 drama films
Dutch black-and-white films
Dutch drama films
1950s Dutch-language films
Films directed by Fons Rademakers